Diploschizia glaucophanes is a species of sedge moth in the genus Diploschizia. It was described by Edward Meyrick in 1922. It is found in South America.

References

External links
 Diploschizia glaucophanes at Zipcodezoo.com

Moths described in 1922
Glyphipterigidae